Cleptometopus quadrilineatus is a species of beetle in the family Cerambycidae. It was described by Pic in 1924.

References

quadrilineatus
Beetles described in 1924